Agamous (AG) is a homeotic gene and MADS-box transcription factor from Arabidopsis thaliana. The TAIR AGI number is AT4G18960.

The identity of a floral organ is determined by particular combinations of homeotic genes, these genes derive from a group of undifferentiated cells known as the floral meristem. The presence of the homeotic gene in Arabidopsis ceases all meristem activity and proceeds to facilitate the development of stamens and carpels.

References

External links 
 Agamous gene information on AtEnsembl

Transcription factors
Arabidopsis thaliana genes